Lindendale is an unincorporated community in Kendall County, Texas, on Ranch to Market Road 1888. It is the site of the one-room Lindendale School.

Unincorporated communities in Kendall County, Texas
Unincorporated communities in Texas